Fal River Links is a consolidation of ferry and boat services serving the River Fal, the River Truro, and Carrick Roads in Cornwall, United Kingdom, providing links to many coastal towns and villages.

See also

 King Harry Ferry

External links
http://www.falrivertickets.co.uk

Water transport in Cornwall